Ficus saussureana, commonly known as the loquat-leaved fig, loquat-leaf fig, old Calabar fig, or nonko, is a species of flowering plant in the fig family. It is native to west and central Africa, with a native range spanning Guinea to South Sudan, western Kenya, and northwestern Tanzania. Ficus saussureana is an arboriform species that grows up to 20m tall with a broad crown. Leaves are arranged in spirals, and are entire. Fruits form just below the leaves in twos or threes, and grow to a diameter of 2-4cm. Pests include Greenidea ficicola, a species of aphid, and Psacothea hilaris, a species of beetle.

References 

saussureana